The men's 10,000 metres track walk at the 1954 European Athletics Championships was held in Bern, Switzerland, at Stadion Neufeld.

Medalists

Results

Final
23 August

Participation
According to an unofficial count, 16 athletes from 9 countries participated in the event.

 (2)
 (2)
 (2)
 (1)
 (2)
 (2)
 (2)
 (2)
 (1)

References

10,000 metres track walk
Racewalking at the European Athletics Championships